Fabian Nürnberger (born 28 July 1999) is a German professional footballer who plays as a left-back or central midfielder for 1. FC Nürnberg.

Career
Nürnberger was born in Hamburg. He played in his youth for the Niendorfer TSV under-19 team and made 21 appearances scoring 4 goals.

As an 18-year-old he moved to Bundesliga club 1. FC Nürnberg in Franconia. For his second team playing in the Regionalliga Bayern, the defender played 31 games as a regular player, in which he was able to contribute three goals and three assists. At the end of the season, he finished third with the team behind promoted and champion Bayern Munich II and VfB Eichstätt.

Following the season, Nürnberger received his first professional contract in May 2019, which is valid until 2021. In addition, he was permanently appointed to the FCN second division squad, trained by Damir Canadi, for which he had already completed training sessions for the 2019–20 season. In the 1–0 home win against VfL Osnabrück on match day 4, Nürnberger was used for the first time after a substitution for a professional team.

On 13 March 2020, 1. FC Nürnberg announced that Nürnberger had tested positive for COVID-19.

References

External links
 
 

Living people
1999 births
German footballers
Association football defenders
Footballers from Hamburg
2. Bundesliga players
Regionalliga players
1. FC Nürnberg players
1. FC Nürnberg II players